The crossthroat sawpalate (Serrivomer jesperseni) is an eel in the family Nemichthyidae (snipe eels). It was described by Marie-Louise Bauchot in 1953. It is a marine, deep water-dwelling eel which is known from the western and eastern Pacific Ocean, including Papua New Guinea, British Columbia, Canada; the Gulf of Panama and Chile. It dwells at a maximum depth of 825 metres. Males can reach a maximum total length of 40.6 centimetres.

The species epithet "jesperseni" refers to P. Jespersen, a monographer of leptocephalids in the family Anguillidae.

References

Nemichthyidae
Taxa named by Marie-Louise Bauchot
Fish described in 1953